Racinaea pendulispica is a plant species in the genus Racinaea. This species is native to Bolivia.

References

pendulispica
Flora of Bolivia